Diede de Groot (born 19 December 1996) is a Dutch wheelchair tennis player who is the current world No. 1 in both singles and doubles.

De Groot is a 33-time major champion, having won 17 titles in singles, and 16 titles in doubles. In 2021, she achieved the first calendar-year Super Slam in tennis history by winning all four singles major titles, the Paralympic gold medal, and the Wheelchair Tennis Masters title in women's singles. The following year, she became the first player in any discipline of tennis to "defend" the Grand Slam, and win all four majors in two consecutive years. De Groot also completed the Grand Slam in doubles in 2019, partnering Aniek van Koot. Apart from her major titles, de Groot has won multiple Wheelchair Tennis Masters titles between 2016 and 2018 in both singles and doubles, as well as gold medals in both disciplines at the 2020 Tokyo Paralympics. She was part of the Dutch team that won the World Team Cup on eight occasions between 2011 and 2019.

Career
De Groot was born with unequal leg length and began her wheelchair tennis career at age seven. She started playing on the ITF Wheelchair Tennis Tour in 2009 as a junior player. During her time with the ITF, De Groot won the Cruyff Foundation Junior Masters in 2013 in singles and doubles. The following year, she won the 2014 Junior Masters in doubles.

De Groot made her first Grand Slam appearance at the 2017 Australian Open. After placing in the quarterfinals at the Australian Open and the 2017 French Open, de Groot won her first Grand Slam title at the 2017 Wimbledon Championships. She ended the 2017 Grand Slam tournaments with a finals finish at the 2017 US Open. At the start of 2018, she won the 2018 Australian Open and appeared at the final of the 2018 French Open. For the remaining Grand Slams of 2018, De Groot won the women's singles division at the 2018 Wimbledon Championships and her first US Open singles title at the 2018 US Open. In 2019, de Groot rewon the Australian Open title in singles competition at the 2019 Australian Open. At the 2019 French Open, de Groot completed her career Grand Slam when she won her first French Open singles title. Her French Open title also made de Groot the first wheelchair tennis player to complete a Non-calendar year Grand Slam (win all four Grand Slam singles events in a row, but not in the same year). At the 2019 Wimbledon Championships, de Groot ended her back to back singles wins when she was defeated by Aniek van Koot in the final. In 2021, she won the Wimbledon Single Ladies Wheelchair championship.

In doubles, De Groot was a runner up in the 2017 Australian, French and Wimbledon championships. After winning her first doubles title at the 2017 US Open, she lost at the 2018 Australian Open and co-won the doubles event at the 2018 French Open. De Groot became the first woman in wheelchair tennis to win both the women's singles and doubles events at Wimbledon in July 2018. She won her second US Open doubles title at the 2018 US Open alongside Yui Kamiji. At the 2019 Australian Open, De Groot won her first Australian doubles title with Aniek van Koot alongside her singles title in January 2019. At the following Grand Slams, De Groot and Van Koot won the 2019 doubles titles at the French Open and Wimbledon.

Outside of the Grand Slam tournaments, De Groot competed at the 2016 Summer Paralympics in singles and doubles competitions. While De Groot did not medal in singles, she won a silver medal in women's doubles. In Masters competitions, De Groot won the 2017 and 2018 Wheelchair Tennis Masters in women's singles. Competing in doubles, she won the 2016 Wheelchair Doubles Masters with Lucy Shuker and the 2017 Wheelchair Doubles Masters alongside Marjolein Buis. She has also appeared at the BNP Paribas World Team Cup in consecutive years from 2011 to 2019. At the World Team Cup, De Groot started as a junior in 2011 before competing a world team competitor in 2012.

De Groot also competed at the 2020 Summer Paralympics, winning gold medals in both singles and doubles.

Golden Slam: 2021
In 2021, De Groot earned the calendar year Golden Slam, winning singles titles in the Australian Open, French Open, Wimbledon, US Open and the singles gold medal at the 2020 Summer Paralympics.  She was the first professional wheelchair tennis player to achieve the feat in the history of the sport. She is also one of just three professional tennis players overall, and first since Steffi Graf in 1988, to accomplish the feat.

Awards and honors
In 2018, de Groot was named ITF World Champion in women's wheelchair tennis. The following year, she was nominated for the Laureus World Sports Award for Sportsperson of the Year with a Disability in 2019.

Career statistics

Grand Slam performance timelines

Wheelchair singles

Wheelchair doubles

Grand Slam tournament finals

Wheelchair singles: 20 finals (17 titles, 3 runner-ups)

Wheelchair doubles: 21 (15 titles, 6 runner-ups)

See also
 List of Grand Slam–related tennis records

References

External links
 
 

1996 births
Living people
Dutch female tennis players
Wheelchair tennis players
Australian Open (tennis) champions
French Open champions
Wimbledon champions
US Open (tennis) champions
Paralympic wheelchair tennis players of the Netherlands
Paralympic gold medalists for the Netherlands
Paralympic silver medalists for the Netherlands
Paralympic medalists in wheelchair tennis
Medalists at the 2016 Summer Paralympics
Medalists at the 2020 Summer Paralympics
Wheelchair tennis players at the 2016 Summer Paralympics
Wheelchair tennis players at the 2020 Summer Paralympics
ITF number 1 ranked wheelchair tennis players
ITF World Champions